, also known as , was a Japanese daimyō of the late Edo period who ruled the Miyazu Domain (modern-day Miyazu, Kyoto).

Official in the bakufu
Munehide served in a variety of positions in the Tokugawa shogunate, ultimately rising to the position of rōjū in the period from September 1864 through September 1866.  Previously, he had been Kyoto shoshidai in the period spanning July 26, 1862, through September 17, 1862. In addition, he served as jisha-bugyō from November 1858 through November 1861; and he was Osaka jōdai from February 1861 through July 1862.

Restoration official
In the Meiji era, he served as chief priest of the Ise Shrine.

|-

Notes

References
 Beasley, William G. (1955). Select Documents on Japanese Foreign Policy, 1853-1868. London: Oxford University Press. [reprinted by RoutledgeCurzon, London, 2001.   (cloth)]

1809 births
1873 deaths
Daimyo
Kannushi
Japanese Shintoists
Kyoto Shoshidai
Rōjū